André Parent,  (born October 3, 1944 ) is a Canadian researcher specializing in neurobiology, and Professor Emeritus at Université Laval.

Born in Montreal, he attended the Université de Montréal  (BSc 1967) and subsequently earned a PhD in neuroanatomy from Université Laval in 1970.  He undertook postdoctoral studies at the Max Planck Institute for Brain Research. In 1981, he became a professor at the department of anatomy at Laval University; and between 1985 and 1992, he was the scientific director of the research centre of the Hôpital de l'Enfant-Jésus and the director of the neurobiology laboratory at the faculty of medicine at the university. His research activity focusses on brain structures that are involved in motor control and often implicated in various neurodegenerative diseases.

Honours/Awards
 1994 - Fellow of the Royal Society of Canada (section III: Academy of Sciences)
 1995 - Léo-Pariseau Prize awarded by Acfas (Association francophone pour le savoir)
 1997 - Killam Fellowship awarded by the Canada Council for the Arts
 1996 - J.C.B. Grant Prize awarded by the Canadian Federation of Biological Societies
 2001 - Jerry Friedman Prize awarded by the Parkinson Society of Canada
 2002 - Wilder-Penfield Prize awarded by the Quebec Government
 2008 - Fellow of the Canadian Academy of Health Sciences
 2016 - Officer of the National Order of Quebec
 2017 - "Grands diplômés (Gloire de l'Escolle)" Medal awarded by the Université Laval
 2017 - Officer of the Order of Canada
 2018 - Fellow of the American Association of Anatomists

References

External links
 André Parent on PubMed

1944 births
Fellows of the Royal Society of Canada
Officers of the Order of Canada
Officers of the National Order of Quebec
Université Laval alumni
Living people
Academic staff of Université Laval
Université de Montréal alumni